Tehran House of Volleyball is a volleyball arena located in Tehran, Iran.

This arena has a capacity of 1,500 and is located on Hejab Street. This arena hosts games of Tehran-based teams in the Iranian Volleyball League.

References

Volleyball venues in Iran
Sports venues in Tehran